The Syracuse Orange women represented Syracuse University in CHA women's ice hockey during the 2019-20 NCAA Division I women's ice hockey season. After a disappointing start of the season against nationally ranked teams, Syracuse had a very successful second half, finishing a competitive third place in the conference, five points from first place Mercyhurst University.

Offseason

Junior Jessica DiGirolamo wasnamed to Hockey Canada's National Women's Development Team for the August, 2019 series against the United States at Lake Placid, New York.

Recruiting

Standings

Roster

2019–20 Orange

2019-20 Schedule

|-
!colspan=12 style="background:#0a2351; "| Regular Season

|-
!colspan=12 style="background:#0a2351; "| CHA Tournament

Awards and honors

Sophomore Forward Abby Moloughney was named the Individual Sportsman of the year in the CHA Conference, with no penalties in conference play. She was also named to the CHA All-Conference First Team Senior Defender and Captain Lindsay Eastwood was also named to the first team, as well as the CHA Best Defenseman. Senior Savannah Rennie was named to the CHA All-Conference Second team on the strength of six multi-point games.

Defender Mae Batherson was named the CHA Rookie of the year. She joined Forward Madison Beishuizen on the Conference All-Rookie Team.

Following the CHA Tournament, Junior Forward Victoria Klimek was named to the All-Tournament team. Klimek had a hat trick in the 4–0 victory against Lindenwood, and had an assist in the season ending loss to Robert Morris.

References

Syracuse
Syracuse Orange women's ice hockey seasons
Syracuse ice hockey
Syracuse ice hockey